Nassau-Siegen was a principality within the Holy Roman Empire that existed between 1303 and 1328, and again from 1606 to 1743.  From 1626 to 1734, it was subdivided into  Catholic and  Protestant parts.   Its capital was the city of Siegen, founded in 1224 and initially a condominium jointly owned by the archbishopric of Cologne and Nassau. It was located some 50 km east of Cologne, and it contained the modern localities of Freudenberg, Hilchenbach, Kreuztal, Siegen, and Wilnsdorf.

First Nassau-Siegen (1303-1328) 

Nassau-Siegen was first created when the sons of Otto I divided their inheritance:
 Henry received Nassau-Siegen
 Emicho received Nassau-Hadamar
 John received Nassau-Dillenburg

John died childless in 1328 and Henry inherited Nassau-Dillenburg.  Henry moved to Dillenburg and his descendants are known as the Nassau-Dillenburg line.

Second Nassau-Siegen (1606-1743) 
After John VI of Nassau-Dillenburg died in 1606, Nassau-Dillenburg was divided among his five surviving sons:
 William Louis received a rather reduced Nassau-Dillenburg
 George received Nassau-Beilstein
 John VII received Nassau-Siegen
 Ernest Casimir received Nassau-Dietz
 John Louis received Nassau-Hadamar

This division created a new principality of Nassau-Siegen.  It belonged to the Lower Rhenish–Westphalian Circle.

After John VII died in 1628, the country was divided:
 His eldest son, John VIII, who had converted to Catholicism, received the part of the county south of the river Sieg and the original castle in Siegen (which after 1695 was called the "Upper Castle").  John VIII was the founder of the Catholic line of Nassau-Siegen.

 John Maurice, who remained Protestant, received the part of the county north of the Sieg.  He was the founder of the Protestant line of Nassau-Siegen and he converted the former Franciscan monastery into a new residence, called the "Lower Castle", which was reconstructed after having burnt down at large parts in 1695. John Maurice spent most of his time away from Siegen, since he was governor of Dutch Brazil and later of the Prussian province of Cleves, Mark, and Ravensberg.

In 1652, John Francis Desideratus of the Catholic line was elevated to Imperial Prince.  Count Henry of the Protestant line married Marie Elisabeth of Limburg-Styrum, who brought the Lordship of Wisch in the County of Zutphen into the marriage.  In 1652, John Maurice of the Protestant line was also elevated to Imperial Prince.

In 1734, the Protestant line died out with the death of Frederick William II. Nassau-Siegen was reunited under William Hyacinth, the last ruler of the Catholic line.  When he died in 1743, Nassau-Siegen had died out in the male line, and the territory fell to Prince William IV of the Orange-Nassau-Dietz line, who thereby reunited all the lands of the Ottonian line of the House of Nassau.

After 1743 
The Rheinbundakte, the treaty of July 12, 1806, that created the Confederation of the Rhine, mediatised Nassau-Siegen and placed it under the sovereignty of the newly created Grand Duchy of Berg.  In 1808, Prince William VI of Orange-Nassau lost his remaining German possessions, as a punishment for his opposition to Napoleon.  In 1813, after the Battle of Leipzig, he regained his territories.  In a treaty signed on  May 31, 1815, he ceded his German possessions to Prussia, in return for Prussia supporting the creation of the United Kingdom of the Netherlands, where he ruled as King William I.

Extent of Nassau-Siegen 
The principality consisted of the districts of Siegen, Netphen, Hilchenbach, and Freudenberg.  From 1628-1734, the Protestant part consisted of the districts of Hilchenbach and Freudenberg and a half the district of Siegen.  At the time, the Catholic half of the district of Siegen was called the district of Hayn.  The Catholic part of the county consisted of the district of Netphen and the other half of the district of Siegen.

In the north, it bordered the Duchy of Westphalia.  In the west, it bordered Wildenburg and Sayn-Altenkirchen.  In the south, it bordered Nassau-Dillenburg and in the east Wittgenstein-Wittgenstein.

History

Rulers of Nassau-Siegen

Undivided

Catholic line

Protestant line

Notes

References 
A.J. Weidenbach: Nassauische Territorien, 1870

External links 
  History of Nassau-Siegen

House of Nassau

Principalities of the Holy Roman Empire
Former countries in Europe
Former states and territories of North Rhine-Westphalia
Nassau-Siegen